The Castle of Castelo Vide is a medieval castle in the civil parish of Santa Maria da Devassa, municipality of Castelo de Vide, Portuguese district of Portalegre. 

It is classified as a National Monument.

Castelo Vide
Castelo Vide
National monuments in Portalegre District